William Laing (1831 – September 29, 1864) was a soldier in the Union Army and a Medal of Honor recipient for his role in the American Civil War.

Laing enlisted in the Army from Brooklyn in August 1862.

Medal of Honor citation
Rank and organization: Sergeant, Company F, 158th New York Infantry. Place and date: At the Battle of Chaffin's Farm, Va., September 29, 1864. Entered service at New York City, N.Y. Birth: Hempstead, N.Y. Date of issue: April 6, 1865.

Citation:

Was among the first to scale the parapet.

See also

List of American Civil War Medal of Honor recipients: G–L

References

External links

1831 births
1864 deaths
 People from Hempstead (town), New York
 United States Army Medal of Honor recipients
 Union Army soldiers
 People of New York (state) in the American Civil War
 American Civil War recipients of the Medal of Honor
Union military personnel killed in the American Civil War